A gulle is a type of sseugae (쓰개), Korean traditional headgear, worn by children aged one year (called dol) to five years old during the late Joseon period. It was mostly worn by young girls in the upper class for warmth and style. Gullae was usually made with silk and in summer, it was made with sa (사), a type of silk loosely woven.

See also
Ayam
Jokduri
Hanbok
Hwagwan

References

External links

Korean headgear